Arwal Assembly constituency is an assembly constituency for Bihar Legislative Assembly in Arwal district of Bihar, India. It comes under Jahanabad (Lok Sabha constituency).

Members of Legislative Assembly

Election results

2020

References

External links
 

Assembly constituencies of Bihar